Scilla cretica is a species of flowering plant in the Asparagaceae family. It is referred to by the common name Cretan glory-of-the-snow, and is a bulbous perennial native to Crete, flowering in early spring. It belongs to a group of Scilla species that were formerly put in a separate genus, Chionodoxa, and may now be treated as Scilla sect. Chionodoxa. It has not always been recognized as distinct from Scilla nana.

Description
Like all members of the former genus Chionodoxa, the bases of the stamens are flattened and closely clustered in the middle of the flower. In other species of Scilla, the stamens are not flattened or clustered together.

Taxonomy
The number of related species recognized as occurring in Crete has varied. In 1987, Sfikas' Wild flowers of Crete recognized two (then placed in Chionodoxa), C. cretica and C. nana. In 1993, the Natural History Museum's checklist of the Cretan Flora recognized only Scilla nana. , the World Checklist of Selected Plant Families accepted both S. cretica and S. nana. Sfikas regards S. cretica as being larger, with bluer flowers, occurring below 1700 m and S. nana as smaller,  with whitish flowers, occurring above 1700 m.

Distribution and habitat
Scilla cretica is native to Crete where it is found at elevations of 1300–1700 m.

References

Bibliography
 
 
 
 
 

cretica
Flora of Crete
Taxa named by Pierre Edmond Boissier
Taxa named by Theodor von Heldreich
Taxa named by Franz Speta